Marion Township is one of twelve townships in Boone County, Indiana. As of the 2010 census, its population was 1,233 and it contained 506 housing units.

Geography

Unincorporated towns
 Terhune
 Waugh

Adjacent townships
 Center (southwest)
 Clinton (west)
 Union (south)
 Adams Township, Hamilton County (east)
 Kirklin Township, Clinton County (northwest)
 Sugar Creek Township, Clinton County (north)
 Washington Township, Hamilton County (southeast)

Major highways
  U.S. Route 421
  Indiana State Road 38
  Indiana State Road 47

Cemeteries
The township contains two cemeteries: Bethel and Parr-Jones.

References
 United States Census Bureau cartographic boundary files
 U.S. Board on Geographic Names

External links

 Indiana Township Association
 United Township Association of Indiana

Townships in Boone County, Indiana
Townships in Indiana